Neven Venkov (born 2 May 1982) is a Bulgarian football player currently playing for Chernolomets Popovo as a midfielder.

References

External links
 

Living people
1982 births
Bulgarian footballers
Association football midfielders
PFC Svetkavitsa players
First Professional Football League (Bulgaria) players